Takaya: Lone Wolf is a documentary film which premiered on CBC’s The Nature of Things in October 2019. The film documents the life of Takaya, a wild lone wolf, and the development of his unique relationship with conservation photographer Cheryl Alexander.

After the film's release in Canada, it was subsequently broadcast on BBC in the United Kingdom and on ARTE in France and Germany.

Synopsis 
The film follows Alexander as she travels alone to Discovery Island by boat, seeking to observe and learn about the wolf. She is intrigued by the mystery of his story, wondering where he came from, how he has adapted to a marine environment, and why he has chosen to live a life of solitude, over 40 kilometres away from the nearest wolf packs.

Alexander begins by setting up hidden trail cameras on the island and shooting over a thousand hours of video footage of the wolf. Over time, Alexander learns that he has adapted to his new environment in remarkable ways, learning to hunt unfamiliar prey and learning to dig for water during periods of drought. She also traces his history by collecting photographic evidence of his journey through the city, and seeks to gain a deeper understanding of his behaviour by interviewing wolf experts and journeying to Yellowstone National Park, which is home to some of the best-studied wolves in the world.

Production 
The documentary was co-directed by Mary Margaret Frymire and Martin Williams and produced by Williams for Talesmith, André Barro for Cineflix, and Gaby Bastyra.

Martin Williams' films have won critical acclaim and numerous industry awards, including three Emmys. Amongst many other films, he has produced films with David Attenborough, Stephen Hawking, and Prince William.

Due to the location of Takaya in Canada, Martin partnered with Cineflix Productions in Montreal and MBMTV Productions in Vancouver to complete the filming. Funding for the project was provided by CBC, Cineflix, BBC and ARTE.

Cast 

 Cheryl Alexander, narrating and appearing as herself
 Jamie Dutcher, co-producer of Wolves at our Door and co-founder of Living With Wolves, as herself
 Dr. Fred Harrington, wolf vocalization expert, as himself
 Kira Cassidy, research associate with the Yellowstone Wolf Project, as herself
 Lesley Wolfe-Milner, local resident, as herself
 Doug Paton, local resident, as herself
Meredith Dickman, lighthouse keeper, as herself
 Paul Harder, local resident, as himself
 Jytte Kaffanke, local resident, as herself
 Mike Sheehan, local resident, as himself

Note: Some cast members do not appear in all versions of the film.

Release 
Takaya: Lone Wolf was released in Canada on CBC's The Nature of Things in October 2019. This version of the film had a running time of 44 minutes.

An extended, 60-minute version of the film was released in the United Kingdom on BBC in December 2019.

In February 2020, the French- and German-language versions of the film were released on ARTE in France and Germany.

The film aired on SVTPlay in Sweden in October 2020.

Awards 

 Finalist for the Canadian Museum of Nature: Nature Inspiration Awards 2021
Winner of 2021 Canadian Screen Award: Rob Stewart Award for Best Science or Nature Documentary Program or Series
Winner of 2020 Leo Awards for Best Short Documentary Program; Best Direction - Short Documentary Program; Best Screenwriting - Short Documentary Program; and Best Cinematography - Short Documentary Program
 Shortlisted for the Grierson Award for Best Natural History Documentary
 Finalist for the Latin American Nature Award for Best Documentary
 Nominated for the Yorkton Film Festival award for Documentary Science/Nature/Technology
 Selected for the Wildlife Conservation Film Festival in New York City
 Selected for screening at Sedona Wolf Week
Selected for the International Wildlife Film Festival
Selected for the Sunset Film Festival Los Angeles

Cultural and Political Impacts 
Since the release of the film, artists from around the world have created artistic tributes to Takaya, including music, paintings, sculptures, and jewelry. Over 80 of these pieces were showcased at the Takaya Lone Wolf International Arts Festival in Victoria on October 24, 2020.

Several public art installations have also been created to honour Takaya's life and legacy.

 Victoria mural artist Paul Archer has painted a larger-than-life mural of Takaya on the side of a lighthouse building on Discovery Island, where Takaya once lived.
 Local artist Kent Laforme has received a commission to create a sculpture of Takaya from a 25,000 pound block of marble.
 Sculptor Tanya Bub has created a five-foot, 150 pound driftwood sculpture of Takaya, which was displayed temporarily at the historic Empress Hotel in Victoria.

Takaya's story has also inspired political campaigns. Over 65,000 people have signed Takaya's Legacy Petition to stop wolf hunting in British Columbia. Two nonprofit organizations, Pacific Wild and Raincoast Conservation Foundation, have also used Takaya's story in campaigns to end the recreational killing and government culling of wolves.

References 

2019 films
2019 documentary films
Canadian documentary television films
CBC Television original films
2010s Canadian films